In mathematics, a submersion is a differentiable map between differentiable manifolds whose differential is everywhere surjective. This is a basic concept in differential topology. The notion of a submersion is dual to the notion of an immersion.

Definition 
Let M and N be differentiable manifolds and  be a differentiable map between them. The map  is a submersion at a point  if its differential

is a surjective linear map. In this case  is called a regular point of the map , otherwise,  is a critical point. A point  is a regular value of  if all points  in the preimage  are regular points. A differentiable map  that is a submersion at each point  is called a submersion.

Indeed, this is the more useful notion in singularity theory. The definition given above is the more commonly used; e.g., in the formulation of Sard's theorem.

Submersion theorem 

The theorem is a consequence of the inverse function theorem (see Inverse function theorem#Giving a manifold structure).

For example, consider  given by  The Jacobian matrix is

Also, the fibers

Examples 
 Any projection 
 Local diffeomorphisms
 Riemannian submersions
 The projection in a smooth vector bundle or a more general smooth fibration. The surjectivity of the differential is a necessary condition for the existence of a local trivialization.

Maps between spheres 
One large class of examples of submersions are submersions between spheres of higher dimension, such as

whose fibers have dimension . This is because the fibers (inverse images of elements ) are smooth manifolds of dimension . Then, if we take a path

and take the pullback

we get an example of a special kind of bordism, called a framed bordism. In fact, the framed cobordism groups  are intimately related to the stable homotopy groups.

Families of algebraic varieties 
Another large class of submersions are given by families of algebraic varieties  whose fibers are smooth algebraic varieties. If we consider the underlying manifolds of these varieties, we get smooth manifolds. For example, the Weierstauss family  of elliptic curves is a widely studied submersion because it includes many technical complexities used to demonstrate more complex theory, such as intersection homology and perverse sheaves. Since we are considering complex varieties, these are equivalently the spaces  of the complex line and the complex plane. Note that we should actually remove the points  because there are singularities (since there is a double root).

Local normal form 
 

This is the content of the regular value theorem (also known as the submersion theorem). In particular, the conclusion holds for all  in  if the map  is a submersion.

Topological manifold submersions 
Submersions are also well-defined for general topological manifolds.

See also 
 Ehresmann's fibration theorem

Notes

References

Further reading 
https://mathoverflow.net/questions/376129/what-are-the-sufficient-and-necessary-conditions-for-surjective-submersions-to-b?rq=1

Maps of manifolds
Smooth functions